Several future projects on the MTR have been put forward by the MTR Corporation to the Hong Kong Government. Some of these are still in planning stage, some are now completed.

Current plans

New lines

Northern Link

The Northern Link is a 10.7 km rapid transit line that once completed, will create a new railway corridor between the Tuen Ma line and the East Rail line in northern New Territories. This project consists of two phases; the first with the opening of Kwu Tung station and the second involves the construction of the Northern Link main line, 3 new stations and the expansion of the existing Kam Sheung Road station. The termini of the line will be Kwu Tung station and Kam Sheung Road station.

There were concerns on the business viability of the Northern Link without substantial housing developments in the New Territories to assist in building costs, which were examined under the Railway Development Strategy 2013. However, it was approved with the government's plan to develop the area into a New Development Area; Kwu Tung station will be commissioned in 2027, while construction of the Northern Link is scheduled to start in 2025 and end in 2034.

In the 2022 Chief Executive's policy address, a new railway line would be built to connect Kam Tin with Kowloon Tong through Kwai Chung to relieve capacity from the Tuen Ma line. It would act as an extension of the Northern Link and interchange at Kowloon Tong station. 

The deputy chairman of the Legco subcommittee on railway affairs, Gary Zhang, added that the Tuen Ma line alone could not provide the capacity needed for commuters travelling from the planned Northern Metropolis to Kowloon and Hong Kong Island.

Line extensions and new stations

Tung Chung line extension 

The Tung Chung line extension has two elements; The first, a 1.3 km eastward extension from the existing Tung Chung line western terminus Tung Chung station for a new terminus, the Tung Chung East station and the construction of an infill station, Tung Chung West station in between the existing Tung Chung and Sunny Bay stations.

In January 2023, John Lee and the Executive Council authorised the Tung Chung Line Extension project.  It is expected to commence construction in 2023, while the cost of the two new stations, Tung Chung East and Tung Chung West, are expected to cost HK$18.7 billion. The contract for the extension was recently awarded to British engineering companies Arup and Atkins. This extension is expected to be complete by 2029.

Oyster Bay station

Oyster Bay station, previously Siu Ho Wan station, is a planned infill station that will be situated in between Sunny Bay station and the future Tung Chung East station. It is expected to open with the Siu Ho Wan Depot Topside Property Development Package 1. The station will be part of the Tung Chung line. It is expected to open in 2030.

Tuen Ma line extension

Hung Shui Kiu station

Hong Kong station track extension

An underground tunnel, around 500 metres long, will be built eastwards of Hong Kong station for overrun tracks. This will allow Tung Chung line and Airport Express trains to turn around, allowing the trains to easily switch directions, enhancing the potential frequency of operation. The project is expected to extend the track length by an additional 1.5 kilometers.

In March 2022, MTR announced the planning and design contract had been awarded to British consultancy firm Mott MacDonald.

Proposals

Line extensions and new stations

Science Park/Pak Shek Kok station

Science Park station is a proposed infill station along the East Rail line located between University and Tai Po Market stations.

Tseung Kwan O Line Southern Extension
In the Chief Executive's 2022 Policy Address, it was announced that the Tseung Kwan O line would be extended southwards to Tseung Kwan O Area 137, an 80 hectare plot of land the Development Bureau has identified suitable for the development of 50,000 new housing units. Area 137 is expected to take in new populations in 2030, but there has been no expected timeline for the completion of the extensions or the opening of the new station.

New lines

South Island line (West) 

On 21 January 2003, the Executive Council of Hong Kong granted MTR Corporation Limited permission to proceed with further planning on two proposed lines: West Island line and South Island line. These new lines were suggested in the Second Railway Development Study and the Railway Development Strategy 2014 report. to provide direct links between the residential areas of Wah Fu and Ap Lei Chau in Southern District and the CBD of Hong Kong. This was the first project within the MTR network that serves the Southern District.

Three proposals were previously submitted, each addressing the drawbacks of the prior plan. The plans were turned down by the government in favour of constructing highways in late March 2004. The MTRC's fourth proposal was given in February 2005. This consisted of an westward extension of the Island line (referred to as West Island line in early planning) and the South Island line (East), which would be connected to the South Island line (West) at HKU station and Wong Chuk Hang station, respectively.

The South Island line (East), currently simply referred to as the South Island line, opened on 28 December 2016.

Plans for the South Island Line (West) were mentioned and revised in the 2014 governmental railway strategy report and an "implementation window" of 2022 to 2026 was identified. A proposal for South Island line (West) was submitted by MTR to the Government of Hong Kong in December 2020. As of 2022, there is no schedule for construction.

North Island line

This would link the Tung Chung line (Hong Kong station) and the Tseung Kwan O line (at North Point). There is currently no schedule for construction.

East Kowloon line

The original scheme of the East Kowloon line would connect Diamond Hill station via Hung Hom station to Sheung Wan station. It was refined and merged into what is today known as the East West Corridor without crossing the harbour to Sheung Wan. 

In 2014, another railway scheme of the same name was unveiled by the government which would provide metro service in the opposite direction to Po Lam station, HKUST Station, via Sau Mau Ping. The 2014 railway development strategy recommended the new line should begin construction in 2019 and be finished in 2025. However, construction has yet to begin and there is no schedule for construction.

Tung Chung to Tai O Light Rail System
On December of 2017, CEDD hired a consultant to study the possibility of a light rail link between Tung Chung station and Tai O Fishing Village on Lantau Island.
The light rail will go around Tung Chung, the airport and the Hong Kong–Zhuhai–Macau Bridge and will take only 15 minutes to make the trip, opposed to the 45 minute bus ride along a small, winding road from Tung Chung or Mui Wo.
The estimated cost of this proposal is HK$15 billion. The consultancy was expected to be completed within the year 2019.
LegCo Transport Panel member Michael Tien said as light rail systems run on overhead lines, it would have a light environmental footprint.

As of 2022, there is no schedule for its construction.

Cable Car System from Ngong Ping to Tai O
In March 2019, CEDD released an executive study outlining an option of the proposed Cable Car extending from Ngong Ping village to Tai O.
This proposal was suggested to be run by Hong Kong MTR.

Hong Kong–Shenzhen Western Express Railway 

Hong Kong–Shenzhen Western Express Railway is a proposed cross-border railway offering three future distinct services, Hong Kong International Airport – Shenzhen Bao'an International Airport direct connection, Hung Shui Kiu–Qianhai cross border services and domestic service between Tuen Mun and Siu Ho Wan.

Lantau Tomorrow Vision 

The Lantau Tomorrow Vision plan involves creating direct railway links from Kau Yi Chau artificial islands to Hong Kong Island West, North Lantau and coastal areas of Tuen Mun.

Other stations
Other studied areas for expansion include:
A short extension of the Island line to Siu Sai Wan station was proposed in 2001 but later shelved in 2014.

Outsourcing
The MTR Corporation is planning to outsource its services centres of 14 stations on the Island line. Around 100 employees will be arranged to work at the Disneyland Resort line and the AsiaWorld–Expo station. Services centres on the new stations of Tseung Kwan O line had already been outsourced when it started its service.

References

MTR